Pashtun Zarghun District ( / ), formerly known as Posht-e Zirghān or Posht-e Zirghūn, is situated in the central part of Herat Province, Afghanistan in the valley of the Hari River. The district center is Pashtun Zarghun.

Geography
Pashtun Zarghun District borders Karukh District to the North, Obe District to the east, Adraskan District to the south and Guzara District to the west.

Population
The estimated population of Khoshi District in 2008 was roughly 90,817.

Education
In 2008, there were around 4 high schools and 20 secondary schools in the district.

References

External links
District Map

Districts of Herat Province